GlenDimplex (formerly known as Glen Electric) is an Irish based consumer electrical goods firm headquartered in Dublin, Ireland. The company is privately held, with manufacturing and development centres in the Republic of Ireland, the United Kingdom, China and many other locations around the world.

The company also has branches in North America, Germany, the Netherlands, Japan, Poland, Belgium, France, Australia and Scandinavia. The company was founded by Martin Naughton, and is wholly owned by him after he bought out the other shareholders in 2003. Sean O'Driscoll became CEO of Glen Dimplex in 2011. Fergal Naughton was later appointed as Group CEO. Fergal Leamy assumed the role of CEO in 2021.

History 

Morphy Richards and Burco Dean Appliances were acquired by the Glen Dimplex Group in 1985, and were based in Mexborough near Doncaster, England.

Creda was acquired by the group in 1987. Belling was acquired in July 1992, Roberts Radio in November 1994, Goblin Vacuum Cleaners in June 1998, LEC Refrigeration in March 2005, Robinson Willey in August 2010, Valor in September 2011, and Real Flame Australia in February 2016. Dimplex was the shirt sponsor of Southampton Football Club from 1993 until 1995.

In 2018 the Merseyside-based home appliances division, which makes cookers and refrigerators under the Britannia, Lec, New World and Stoves brands, announced a "streamlining" of operations, resulting in up to 300 of its 1,000 permanent staff at its Knowsley plant being made redundant.

Brands and acquisitions

References

Manufacturing companies of Northern Ireland
Manufacturing companies based in Dublin (city)
Home appliance manufacturers of the United Kingdom
Heating, ventilation, and air conditioning companies
Irish brands